Lillian Ngoyi is the lead vessel in the South African Department of Agriculture, Forestry and Fisheries's  inshore patrol vessels. She was built in South Africa by Farocean Marine based on the Damen Stan patrol vessel 4708 design. As well as fishery protection duties, the vessel is equipped for cleaning up oil spills, search-and-rescue work, fire fighting and limited towing. The ship will operate up to 200 nautical miles offshore.

Within months of her commissioning the South African government was reporting successful anti-poaching operations.

Like her sister ships,  and  she is named in honor of an anti-apartheid activist — Lillian Ngoyi.

References

2004 ships
Patrol vessels of South Africa